Tuğçe is a common feminine Turkish given name. The name is a diminutive of tuğ "horse-tail", a type of rank insignia or field ensign used in the Ottoman army. 

People named "Tuğçe" include:
Tuğçe Albayrak (1991–2014), German-Turkish victim of violence, see Death of Tuğçe Albayrak
Tuğçe Canıtez (born 1990), Turkish basketball player
Tuğçe İnöntepe (born 1987), Turkish basketball player
Tuğçe Kazaz (born 1982), Turkish model and Miss Turkey 2001
Tuğçe Murat (born 1991), Turkish basketball player
Tuğçe Şahutoğlu (born 1988), Turkish hammer thrower

Turkish feminine given names